William Henry Joseph Brogan (28 April 1900 – 6 March 1983) was an Australian rugby league footballer who played in the 1920s and 1930s. He was a state and national representative.

Background
Brogan was born at West Wyalong, New South Wales on 28 April 1900.

Playing career
He joined Western Suburbs Magpies in 1929, and after a stirling season, he was selected on the 1929/30 Kangaroo Tour and played in all three tests against England. 

Brogan is listed on the Australian Players Register as Kangaroo No.151. Brogan spent five years at Wests between 1929-1933 and won a premiership with them in 1930.  Brogan also made 11 appearances for New South Wales.

Coaching career
He retired from Sydney football in 1933 to captain-coach Warialda and Moree Rugby Leagues clubs.

Death
Brogan died at Earlwood, New South Wales on 6 March 1983, aged 83.

References

1900 births
1983 deaths
Australia national rugby league team players
Australian rugby league coaches
Australian rugby league players
New South Wales rugby league team players
Rugby league players from New South Wales
Western Suburbs Magpies coaches
Western Suburbs Magpies players